Melinda Sue (Furche) Harmon (born November 1, 1946 in Port Arthur, Texas) is an inactive Senior United States district judge of the United States District Court for the Southern District of Texas, best known as the lead judge in the subsequently overruled Arthur Andersen trial. Civil lawsuits against Enron were consolidated in her court; she oversaw class action lawsuits on behalf of both Enron shareholders and its employees.

Education and career
Born in Port Arthur, Texas, Harmon attended high school in Justin, Texas, then received an Artium Baccalaureus from Radcliffe College in 1969, followed by a Juris Doctor from the University of Texas School of Law in 1972. She served as a law clerk for Judge John Virgil Singleton Jr. of the United States District Court for the Southern District of Texas from 1973 to 1975. Harmon worked as a trial lawyer for Exxon Company, USA for 12 years during the 1970s and 1980s. In 1986 she ran unsuccessfully for election to a state district court bench, but was appointed by the Governor of Texas to a vacancy in the district court of Harris County, in 1987, a seat that she successfully retained by election in 1988.

Federal judicial service
On February 28, 1989, Harmon was nominated by President George H. W. Bush to a seat on the United States District Court for the Southern District of Texas vacated by John Virgil Singleton Jr. Harmon was confirmed by the United States Senate on May 18, 1989, and received her commission on May 22, 1989. Harmon assumed senior status on March 31, 2018.

Major cases
 Arthur Andersen LLP v. United States

References

External links
 
 BBC article mentioning her role in Arthur Anderson trial
 Granted David Duncan's plea change to obstruction of justice

1946 births
Living people
Judges of the United States District Court for the Southern District of Texas
United States district court judges appointed by George H. W. Bush
Texas state court judges
20th-century American judges
Radcliffe College alumni
University of Texas School of Law alumni
People from Port Arthur, Texas
21st-century American judges
20th-century American women judges
21st-century American women judges